The Tangshang Formation is a Late Cretaceous Mesozoic geologic formation in China. Dinosaur and pterosaur remains diagnostic to the genus level are among the fossils that have been recovered from the formation. The formation has been dated around 92.9 million to 81.5 million years ago.

Paleobiota of the Tangshang Formation

See also

 List of dinosaur-bearing rock formations
 List of stratigraphic units with few dinosaur genera

References

Mesozoic Erathem of Asia